This is a list of television films produced for the cable network Freeform and its predecessors, The Family Channel, Fox Family, and ABC Family. The network temporarily stopped making new original films from 2013 until 2016.
Most films are subsequently released on home video ( indicated with * ).

The Family Channel

1990

1992

1993

1994

1995

1996

1997

1998

Fox Family

1998

1999

2000

2001

ABC Family

2000s

2001

2002

2003

2004

2005

2006

2007

2008

2009

2010s

2010

2011

2012

2013

Freeform

2010s

2016

2017

2018

2019

2020s

2020

References